The Northern Combination Women's Football League, also known simply as the Northern Combination, was a women's football league in England from 1998 to 2014. Until the creation of the FA Women's Super League in 2011, they sat at the third level of English women's football pyramid along with the three other Combination Leagues – South West, South East and Midland. The Northern Combination fed into the FA Women's Premier League Northern Division, and lied above the North West Women's Regional Football League and the North East Regional Women's Football League in the pyramid. For the 2014–15 season the Midland Combination was incorporated into the newly re-structured FA Women's Premier League as the FA WPL Northern Division One.

Clubs for 2013–14 season

Previous winners

References
History of the Northern Combination from ncfl.co.uk. Retrieved 21 November 2006.
Northern Women's Combination League. Retrieved 2 July 2011

External links
Official website of the Northern Combination. Retrieved 21 November 2006.
At FA Full-time

Sports leagues established in 1998
4